Francis Ernuszt de Csáktornya (1500 – 29 August 1526), also known as Francis Hampó, was a Hungarian noble and royal chamberlain in the court of Louis II of Hungary.

Family
He was a member of the Ernuszt noble family of Jewish origin, founded by his paternal grandfather, John I Ernuszt. Francis was the eldest son of John II Ernuszt, Ban of Croatia, Dalmatia and Slavonia and his second wife, Princess Margaret of Sagan (Żagań), daughter of Jan II the Mad. He had a younger brother, John III. His uncle was Sigismund, Bishop of Pécs. Through his mother, he was also a half-brother of John Bánffy, Palatine of Hungary, author Katalin Bánffy and Margit Bánffy, spouse of John II Both de Bajna (killed in the Siege of Belgrade in 1521), later John Dombai. After his mother's death, his father married Barbara Ország. From this marriage, Francis also had two half-brothers, Farkas and Caspar, who was the last male member of the Ernuszt family.

He married Elizabeth Ungnad, the queen's maid of honor in 1526. Their marriage did not produce children, because Francis Ernuszt was soon killed in the Battle of Mohács on 29 August 1526. The family property was inherited by his younger brother Caspar following his father's death around 1528.

Ancestors

References

Sources 

1500s births
1526 deaths
Francis
16th-century Hungarian people